Isle of Ely was a county constituency represented in the House of Commons of the Parliament of the United Kingdom, centred on the Isle of Ely in Cambridgeshire. Until its abolition in 1983, it elected one Member of Parliament (MP) by the first past the post system of election.

History
The Isle had previously been represented by two members of the First and Second Protectorate Parliaments, between 1654 and 1658.

The twentieth century constituency was created in 1918 and remained virtually unchanged until its abolition in 1983. The territory included in the new seat was similar to that previously constituting the Wisbech constituency (the north division of Cambridgeshire). That constituency was dominated by the Fens, a district of Liberal inclined smallholders. The towns in the Wisbech division, predominantly Conservative Wisbech and the more Liberal inclined March, tended to be outvoted by the rural areas.

The small city of Ely had formerly been part of the Newmarket constituency (the east division of Cambridgeshire). Pelling suggests Ely was Conservative "because of the cathedral and its fairly substantial middle-class population".

In 1918, the former Liberal MP for Wisbech, Colin Coote, was returned unopposed as a Coalition Liberal. In 1922 Coote contested the seat again, this time as a National Liberal candidate. A Labour candidate appeared for the first time. The anti-Conservative vote was badly split (National Liberal 27.7% and Labour 21.4%), so the Conservative soldier Lieutenant Colonel Norman Coates was easily elected. Coates retired and did not seek re-election in 1923.

In 1923, the reunited Liberal Party nominated a member of the family of one of their richest members. Henry Mond was the son of the industrialist Alfred Mond (later the 1st Lord Melchett). He was able to squeeze the Labour vote down to 12.4%, which was sufficient for a narrow Liberal victory as part of the party's best election result after the First World War.

In the 1924 general election, both the Conservative and Labour candidates increased their vote. Mond was defeated. The new MP was the Conservative, Sir Hugh Lucas-Tooth, Bt. Lucas-Tooth had a long political career, not leaving the House of Commons until 1970, but he only retained this seat for one Parliament until his defeat in 1929.

The Monds had joined the Conservative Party in 1926 after a disagreement with Lloyd George's land policy. However another rich Liberal stood in this constituency in 1929, the flamboyant James de Rothschild. He retained the seat for three Parliaments, serving from 1929 to 1945. In the 1945 general election de Rothschild came third, the first time this had happened to any Liberal candidate in the constituency.

It must have appeared that the days when the Isle seat was a Conservative/Liberal marginal had ended in 1945. The new Conservative MP, Harry Legge-Bourke, had a majority of 6.1% over Labour, with the Liberal almost 10% further behind. He retained the seat until his death in 1973, with Labour in second place. The Liberal Party did not contest general elections in 1951, 1955, 1959, 1964 and 1970. The Liberal vote in 1966 was only 11.4%.

Clement Freud gained the seat for the Liberals from the Conservatives in a 1973 by-election during the height of the 1970s Liberal revival. He retained this seat until it was abolished in 1983; however, Freud surprisingly lost its successor seat in 1987.

The constituency was renamed in 1983, with most of the territory incorporated into the constituency of North East Cambridgeshire.

Boundaries

In the Representation of the People Act 1918, the county constituency was defined as having the same boundaries as the administrative county of the Isle of Ely, which had been formed in 1889 from a traditional sub-division of the historic county of Cambridgeshire in East Anglia. The bulk of the constituency was formed from the abolished Wisbech Division of Cambridgeshire, with the northernmost parts of the abolished Chesterton and Newmarket Divisions, including the city of Ely.

In 1965, the Isle of Ely county was merged into the new administrative county of Cambridgeshire and Isle of Ely and in the next redistribution of parliamentary seats, which took effect for the February 1974 general election, the constituency was defined as comprising the Municipal Borough of Wisbech; the urban districts of Chatteris, Ely, March, and Whittlesey; and the rural districts of Ely, North Witchford, and Wisbech. The only change was the loss of the small rural district of Thorney, which had been included in the new administrative county of Huntingdon and Peterborough and was now transferred to the borough constituency of Peterborough.

Meanwhile, as a result of the Local Government Act 1972, the two counties of Cambridgeshire and Isle of Ely, and Huntingdon and Peterborough were merged to form the non-metropolitan county of Cambridgeshire, with effect from 1 April 1974. However, the next redistribution did not come into effect until the 1983 general election, when the constituency was replaced by North East Cambridgeshire, with only minor changes to the boundaries.  The city of Ely was included in the new county constituency of South East Cambridgeshire, and the villages of Thorney and Eye were returned from Peterborough.

Members of Parliament

Elections

Elections in the 1910s

Elections in the 1920s

Elections in the 1930s

Elections in the 1940s

Elections in the 1950s

Elections in the 1960s

Elections in the 1970s

See also
 Parliamentary representation from Cambridgeshire
 1973 Isle of Ely by-election
 List of former United Kingdom Parliament constituencies

References

Sources 
 Boundaries of Parliamentary Constituencies 1885–1972, compiled and edited by F.W.S. Craig (Political Reference Publications 1972)
 British Parliamentary Election Results 1918–1949, compiled and edited by F.W.S. Craig (The Macmillan Press 1977)
 British Parliamentary Election Results 1950–1973, compiled and edited by F.W.S. Craig (Parliamentary Research Services 1983)
 British Parliamentary Election Results 1974–1983, compiled and edited by F.W.S. Craig (Parliamentary Research Services 1984)
 Social Geography of British Elections 1885–1910, by Henry Pelling (Macmillan 1967)
 Who's Who of British members of parliament, Volume III 1919–1945, edited by M. Stenton and S. Lees (Harvester Press 1979)
 Who's Who of British members of parliament, Volume IV 1945–1979, edited by M. Stenton and S. Lees (Harvester Press 1981)

Ely, Cambridgeshire
Isle of Ely
Constituencies of the Parliament of the United Kingdom established in 1918
Constituencies of the Parliament of the United Kingdom disestablished in 1983